"Fooled by a Feeling" is a song written by Kye Fleming and Dennis Morgan, and recorded by American country music artist Barbara Mandrell.  It was released in July 1979 as the first single from the album Just for the Record.  The song reached number 4 on the Billboard Hot Country Singles & Tracks chart.

Chart performance

References

1979 singles
1979 songs
Barbara Mandrell songs
Songs written by Kye Fleming
Songs written by Dennis Morgan (songwriter)
Song recordings produced by Tom Collins (record producer)
MCA Records singles